Åsa Maria Sandell (born January 24, 1967) is a Swedish journalist and professional female super middleweight boxer.

Early life
Sandell was born in Hovsta in Örebro County, and has a university degree in journalism and literature.

Career
She was European champion in 2000 and has been Swedish champion a few times. She met Laila Ali on December 17, 2005 in the Max-Schmeling-Halle, Berlin, but the judges controversially decided that she had lost on points after five rounds.

Personal life
As of 2004, she lives in Malmö and works as editor at the Culture section at the newspaper Helsingborgs Dagblad, based in nearby Helsingborg.

Professional boxing record

References

External links

1967 births
Living people
Swedish journalists
Swedish women boxers
People from Örebro
Super-middleweight boxers